Shuzhega is a rural locality (a village) in Vinogradovsky District, Arkhangelsk Oblast, Russia. The population was five as of 2010.

Geography 
Shuzhega is located on the Severnaya Dvina River, 47 km southeast of Bereznik (the district's administrative centre) by road. Pleso is the nearest rural locality.

References 

Rural localities in Vinogradovsky District